Alexandre Ruben Martinez Gutiérrez (born 4 March 1987) is an Andorran international footballer who plays club football for UE Santa Coloma, as a defender.

He made his international debut for the Andorra national football team in 2010.

References

1987 births
Living people
Andorran footballers
Andorra international footballers
UE Santa Coloma players
Association football defenders